Matveyevka is the name of several  rural localities in Russia.

Altai Krai
As of 2010, one rural locality in Altai Krai bears this name:
Matveyevka, Altai Krai, a selo in Tumanovsky Selsoviet of Soloneshensky District

Republic of Bashkortostan
As of 2010, one rural locality in the Republic of Bashkortostan bears this name:
Matveyevka, Republic of Bashkortostan, a village in Pervomaysky Selsoviet of Sterlitamaksky District

Kaliningrad Oblast
As of 2010, one rural locality in Kaliningrad Oblast bears this name:
Matveyevka, Kaliningrad Oblast, a settlement in Nizovsky Rural Okrug of Guryevsky District

Khabarovsk Krai
As of 2010, one rural locality in Khabarovsk Krai bears this name:
Matveyevka, Khabarovsk Krai, a selo of Khabarovsky District

Kirov Oblast
As of 2010, one rural locality in Kirov Oblast bears this name:
Matveyevka, Kirov Oblast, a village in Zimnyaksky Rural Okrug of Kilmezsky District

Kostroma Oblast
As of 2010, one rural locality in Kostroma Oblast bears this name:
Matveyevka, Kostroma Oblast, a village in Shangskoye Settlement of Sharyinsky District

Krasnoyarsk Krai
As of 2010, two rural localities in Krasnoyarsk Krai bear this name:
Matveyevka, Abansky District, Krasnoyarsk Krai, a village in Nikolsky Selsoviet of Abansky District
Matveyevka, Kazachinsky District, Krasnoyarsk Krai, a village in Vorokovsky Selsoviet of Kazachinsky District

Kurgan Oblast
As of 2010, one rural locality in Kurgan Oblast bears this name:
Matveyevka, Kurgan Oblast, a selo in Matveyevsky Selsoviet of Tselinny District

Kursk Oblast
As of 2010, eight rural localities in Kursk Oblast bear this name:
Matveyevka, Kastorensky District, Kursk Oblast, a village in Zhernovetsky Selsoviet of Kastorensky District
Matveyevka, Konyshyovsky District, Kursk Oblast, a village in Mashkinsky Selsoviet of Konyshyovsky District
Matveyevka, Korenevsky District, Kursk Oblast, a village in Korenevsky Selsoviet of Korenevsky District
Matveyevka, Ponyrovsky District, Kursk Oblast, a village in Nizhnesmorodinsky Selsoviet of Ponyrovsky District
Matveyevka, Ozersky Selsoviet, Shchigrovsky District, Kursk Oblast, a village in Ozersky Selsoviet of Shchigrovsky District
Matveyevka, Znamensky Selsoviet, Shchigrovsky District, Kursk Oblast, a village in Znamensky Selsoviet of Shchigrovsky District
Matveyevka, Donskoy Selsoviet, Zolotukhinsky District, Kursk Oblast, a village in Donskoy Selsoviet of Zolotukhinsky District
Matveyevka, Sedmikhovsky Selsoviet, Zolotukhinsky District, Kursk Oblast, a village in Sedmikhovsky Selsoviet of Zolotukhinsky District

Lipetsk Oblast
As of 2010, two rural localities in Lipetsk Oblast bear this name:
Matveyevka, Dobrinsky District, Lipetsk Oblast, a village in Bereznegovatsky Selsoviet of Dobrinsky District
Matveyevka, Izmalkovsky District, Lipetsk Oblast, a village in Afanasyevsky Selsoviet of Izmalkovsky District

Moscow Oblast
As of 2010, one rural locality in Moscow Oblast bears this name:
Matveyevka, Moscow Oblast, a village in Gazoprovodskoye Rural Settlement of Lukhovitsky District

Nizhny Novgorod Oblast
As of 2010, one rural locality in Nizhny Novgorod Oblast bears this name:
Matveyevka, Nizhny Novgorod Oblast, a village in Redkinsky Selsoviet of the city of oblast significance of Bor

Novosibirsk Oblast
As of 2010, one rural locality in Novosibirsk Oblast bears this name:
Matveyevka, Novosibirsk Oblast, a village in Chanovsky District

Orenburg Oblast
As of 2010, two rural localities in Orenburg Oblast bear this name:
Matveyevka, Matveyevsky District, Orenburg Oblast, a selo in Matveyevsky Selsoviet of Matveyevsky District
Matveyevka, Sorochinsky District, Orenburg Oblast, a selo in Matveyevsky Selsoviet of Sorochinsky District

Oryol Oblast
As of 2010, one rural locality in Oryol Oblast bears this name:
Matveyevka, Oryol Oblast, a village in Dubrovsky Selsoviet of Dolzhansky District

Ryazan Oblast
As of 2010, two rural localities in Ryazan Oblast bear this name:
Matveyevka, Ryazansky District, Ryazan Oblast, a village in Vyshetravinsky Rural Okrug of Ryazansky District
Matveyevka, Starozhilovsky District, Ryazan Oblast, a village under the administrative jurisdiction of the work settlement of  Starozhilovo in Starozhilovsky District

Saratov Oblast
As of 2010, two rural localities in Saratov Oblast bear this name:
Matveyevka, Balakovsky District, Saratov Oblast, a selo in Balakovsky District
Matveyevka, Dergachyovsky District, Saratov Oblast, a settlement in Dergachyovsky District

Tambov Oblast
As of 2010, one rural locality in Tambov Oblast bears this name:
Matveyevka, Tambov Oblast, a village in Pokrovo-Marfinsky Selsoviet of Znamensky District

Tula Oblast
As of 2010, one rural locality in Tula Oblast bears this name:
Matveyevka, Tula Oblast, a village in Vasilyevsky Rural Okrug of Venyovsky District

Tver Oblast
As of 2010, one rural locality in Tver Oblast bears this name:
Matveyevka, Tver Oblast, a village in Kimrsky District

Ulyanovsk Oblast
As of 2010, one rural locality in Ulyanovsk Oblast bears this name:
Matveyevka, Ulyanovsk Oblast, a selo in Matveyevsky Rural Okrug of Staromaynsky District

Vladimir Oblast
As of 2010, one rural locality in Vladimir Oblast bears this name:
Matveyevka, Vladimir Oblast, a village in Selivanovsky District

Yaroslavl Oblast
As of 2010, two rural localities in Yaroslavl Oblast bear this name:
Matveyevka, Pereslavsky District, Yaroslavl Oblast, a village in Zagoryevsky Rural Okrug of Pereslavsky District
Matveyevka, Uglichsky District, Yaroslavl Oblast, a village in Slobodskoy Rural Okrug of Uglichsky District